Tui Amar Rani  is a Bengali feature film directed and produced by Pijush Saha, starring  Rubel Das and Misty in lead roles. It was released on 12 April 2019. This film, presented by Prince Entertainment P4, is a  social awareness film.

Synopsis
Raja, a law student, falls for the daughter of Shivram, a powerful local figure with whom he has had issues in the past. Is there a happy ending for the young couple or will Shivram stand between them?

Cast
Rubel Das as Raja
Misty Jannat as Misti 
Rajesh Sharma as Shibram Ghosh
Supriyo Dutta as Khokon Gunin
Lama Halder as Jagobandhu Maiti
Abu Hena Rani as Kesta

Soundtrack

References

External links
 

2019 films
Bengali-language Indian films
2010s Bengali-language films